Return Creek is a stream in the northeast part of Yosemite National Park, in Tuolumne County, California, and is a tributary of the Tuolumne River. About  in length, it is the first major tributary to join downstream of Tuolumne Meadows. The creek begins at Return Lake on the Sierra Crest, near Virginia Pass, and flows initially east before turning southwest and joining with McCabe Creek and Spiller Creek. After its confluence with Matterhorn Creek it flows south-southwest to its confluence with the Tuolumne River, about a quarter mile (400 m) below Waterwheel Falls.

The Pacific Crest Trail follows part of Virginia Canyon and crosses Return Creek just above the confluence of McCabe Creek.

Return Creek has also been labeled, on early maps, as the North Fork of the Tuolumne River. This is not to be confused with the actual North Fork Tuolumne River, located much further to the west.

References

Rivers of Tuolumne County, California
Rivers of Yosemite National Park